Golam Akbar Khandaker is a politician from Chittagong District of Bangladesh. He was elected a member of parliament from Chittagong-6 in February 1996.

Career 
Golam Akbar Khandaker is the central organizing secretary of the BNP and advisor to the chairperson. He was elected a Member of Parliament from Chittagong-6 constituency as an Bangladesh Nationalist Party candidate in the Sixth Parliamentary Election on 15 February 1996. After the BNP came to power in 2001, he served as ambassador.

References 

Living people
Year of birth missing (living people)
People from Chittagong District
Bangladesh Nationalist Party politicians
6th Jatiya Sangsad members